Skorišnjak is a settlement in the Haloze Hills in eastern Slovenia, close to the border with Croatia. It belongs to the Municipality of Videm. The area traditionally belonged to the Styria region. It is now included in the Drava Statistical Region.

There is a small rectangular chapel with a semicircular apse and a belfry in the settlement. It was built in the early 20th century.

References

External links
Skorišnjak on Geopedia

Populated places in the Municipality of Videm